The Texas School Book Depository, now known as the Dallas County Administration Building, is a seven-floor building facing Dealey Plaza in Dallas, Texas. The building was Lee Harvey Oswald's vantage point during the assassination of United States President John F. Kennedy on November 22, 1963. The Warren Commission concluded that Oswald, an employee at the depository, shot and mortally wounded President Kennedy from a sixth floor window on the building's southeastern corner; Kennedy died at Parkland Memorial Hospital. 

The building, located at 411 Elm Street on the northwest corner of Elm and North Houston Streets in downtown Dallas, is a Texas Historic Landmark.

Early history
The site of the building was originally owned by John Neely Bryan. During the 1880s, Maxime Guillot operated a wagon shop on the property. In 1894, the Rock Island Plow Company bought the land, and four years later constructed a five-story building for its Texas division, the Southern Rock Island Plow Company. In 1901, the building was hit by lightning and nearly burned to the ground. It was rebuilt in 1902 in the Commercial Romanesque Revival style and expanded to seven stories. In 1937, the Carraway Byrd Corporation purchased the property, but they defaulted on the loan. It was sold at public auction July 4, 1939 and purchased by D. Harold Byrd.

Under Byrd's ownership, the building remained empty until 1940, when it was leased by grocery wholesaler John Sexton & Co. Sexton Foods used this location as the branch office for sales, manufacturing, and distribution for the south and southwest United States. In November 1961, Sexton Foods moved to a modern distribution facility located at 650 Regal Row Dallas; by then, the building was known locally as the Sexton Building. The building was refurbished, and partitions, carpeting, air conditioning, and a new passenger elevator were added on the first four floors.

Assassination of John F. Kennedy

In 1963, the building was in use as a multi-floor warehouse storing school textbooks and other related materials and an order-fulfillment center by the privately owned Texas School Book Depository Company, which had moved from the first floor of the adjacent Dal-Tex Building. The company found that the upper floors had sustained oil damage from items stored there by the previous tenant, so they began to cover the floors with plywood to protect their books (stored in cardboard boxes) from the oil. Work had begun on the west side of the sixth floor just before President Kennedy's motorcade, "leaving the whole scene in disarray, with stock shifted as far as the east wall, and stacks in between piled unusually high." Lee Harvey Oswald was working as a temporary employee at the building, and fired three shots from a sixth floor window at the presidential motorcade on November 22, 1963.

Second building
The Texas School Book Depository Company maintained a second warehouse at 1917 Houston, several blocks north of the main building. The short four-story structure was well removed from the parade route, half-hidden on an unpaved section of Houston. Oswald's supervisor Roy Truly told the Warren Commission that he had the option to assign Oswald to either building on his first day at work. "Oswald and another fellow reported for work on the same day [October 15] and I needed one of them for the depository building. I picked Oswald."  This second building was eventually destroyed to make way for the Woodall Rodgers Freeway.

Later years
During his two terms as mayor of Dallas, Wes Wise guided Dallas out from under the cloud of the assassination and at the same time saved the Texas School Book Depository from imminent destruction, preserving it for further research into the president's murder.

The Texas School Book Depository Company moved out in 1970 and the building was sold at auction to Aubrey Mayhew, a Nashville, Tennessee music producer and collector of Kennedy memorabilia, by the owner D. H. Byrd. In 1972, ownership reverted to Bard, and the building was purchased in 1977 by the government of Dallas County. After renovating the lower five floors of the building for use as county government offices, the Dallas County Administration Building was dedicated on March 29, 1981.

On President's Day 1989, the sixth floor opened to the public (for an admission charge) as the Sixth Floor Museum of assassination-related exhibits. On President's Day 2002, the seventh-floor gallery opened. The gallery opened on February 18, 2002 with the exhibit: "The Pulitzer Prize Photographs: Capture the Moment". A $2.5 million renovation turned the storage area on the seventh floor into a new gallery space for the museum. Other exhibits that have hung in the space include works of Andy Warhol.

On May 4, 2010, burglars attempted to steal a safe from the Sixth Floor Museum, but fled when "they were confronted by a security guard," leaving the unopened safe suspended from a winch on the back of a truck.

See also

List of National Historic Landmarks in Texas
National Register of Historic Places listings in Dallas County, Texas
Recorded Texas Historic Landmarks in Dallas County
List of Dallas Landmarks
Assassination of John F. Kennedy in popular culture

References

External links

 live webcam, EarthCam, from the southeast corner window of the sixth floor in the former Texas School Book Depository
 Official property ownership record from the Dallas Central Appraisal District
 

History of Dallas
Buildings and structures in Dallas
Buildings and structures associated with the assassination of John F. Kennedy
County government buildings in Texas
Downtown Dallas
Landmarks in Dallas
Industrial buildings completed in 1903
Historic warehouses in the United States
Tourist attractions in Dallas
1903 establishments in Texas